The SCR-189 was a mobile Signal Corps Radio tested by the United States Army before World War II. It was designed for armored forces, and mounted in the Six Ton Tank M1917. The original production run of these tanks included 50 "radio tanks" but the original radio components are unknown,  so what or how many tanks were fitted with the SCR-189 also appears to be unknown.

Use

An early tactical vehicle radio, it was the first Army set to utilize the Superheterodyne receiver. As the M1917 tank was phased out, the new M1 Combat Car and M2 Light Tank were equipped with SCR-189's. The SCR-189 was replaced by the SCR-245 in 1937.

Components
 BC-175 Receiver
 BC-176 Transmitter CW/voice, 2.200 kHz, to 2.600 kHz at 7.5 Watt, range 8 Miles
 BC-177 Control box
 BC-206 Control box
 PE-48 Power supply
 Battery box BX-3 (Battery BA-27)

Variants
 SCR-190 Receiver only set

See also
 Radio Tractor
 Signal Corps Radio
 SCR-193
 Crystal radio

References

External links
 https://web.archive.org/web/20100413132056/http://www.gordon.army.mil/ocos/museum/equipment.asp scr and bc lists

Amateur radio transmitters
Military radio systems of the United States
Military electronics of the United States
Military equipment introduced in the 1930s